Estola attenuata is a species of beetle in the family Cerambycidae. It was described by Fisher in 1926. It is known from Jamaica.

References

Estola
Beetles described in 1926